The 1924 Arizona gubernatorial election took place on November 4, 1924. Despite being a Republican year nationally, President Coolidge's election in Arizona was rather close. He only took Arizona with 40% of the vote against Davis' 35% and La Follette's 23%. The closest Arizona gubernatorial election since 1916, Hunt's lead in votes would continue to decline.

With barely a percent separating the two, Hunt narrowly beat owner of the Arizona Republican newsletter, Dwight Heard. Heard had in fact previously backed 1914 Progressive nominee George Young against Hunt over the Republican, Ralph Cameron, and had been an enemy of Hunt for over a decade at this point.

Governor W. P. Hunt was sworn in for a fifth term as Governor on January 5, 1925.

Democratic primary

Candidates
George W. P. Hunt, incumbent Governor, former Ambassador to Siam
Sidney P. Osborn, former Secretary of State, former primary candidate for Governor  
Edward W. Samuell, farmer, resigned as Secretary of the Board of Directors of State Institutions to run in primary

Results

General election

References

Bibliography

1924
1924 United States gubernatorial elections
Gubernatorial
November 1924 events